Statistics of Liberian Premier League for the 1992 season.

Overview
It was contested by 16 teams, and Liberia Petroleum Refining Company Oilers won the championship.

Group stage

Group A

Group B

Group C

Group D

Final

References
Liberia - List of final tables (RSSSF)

Football competitions in Liberia
Lea